In mathematics, a hyperbolic metric space is a metric space satisfying certain metric relations (depending quantitatively on a nonnegative real number δ) between points. The definition, introduced by Mikhael Gromov, generalizes the metric properties of classical hyperbolic geometry and of trees. Hyperbolicity is a large-scale property, and is very useful to the study of certain infinite groups called Gromov-hyperbolic groups.

Definitions 

In this paragraph we give various definitions of a -hyperbolic space.

Definition using the Gromov product 

Let  be a metric space. The Gromov product of two points  with respect to a third one  is defined by the formula:

Gromov's definition of a hyperbolic metric space is then as follows:  is -hyperbolic if and only if all  satisfy the four-point condition

Note that if this condition is satisfied for all  and one fixed base point , then it is satisfied for all  with a constant . Thus the hyperbolicity condition only needs to be verified for one fixed base point; for this reason, the subscript for the base point is often dropped from the Gromov product.

Definitions using triangles 

Up to changing  by a constant multiple, there is an equivalent geometric definition involving triangles when the metric space  is geodesic, i.e. any two points  are end points of a geodesic segment  (an isometric image of a compact subinterval  of the reals).   Note that the definition via Gromov products does not require the space to be geodesic.

Let . A geodesic triangle with vertices  is the union of three geodesic segments  (where  denotes a segment with endpoints  and ).

A definition of a -hyperbolic space is then a geodesic metric space all of whose geodesic triangles are -slim. This definition is generally credited to Eliyahu Rips.

Another definition can be given using the notion of a -approximate center of a geodesic triangle: this is a point which is at distance at most  of any edge of the triangle (an "approximate" version of the incenter). A space is -hyperbolic if every geodesic triangle has a -center.

These two definitions of a -hyperbolic space using geodesic triangles are not exactly equivalent, but there exists  such that a -hyperbolic space in the first sense is -hyperbolic in the second, and vice versa. Thus the notion of a hyperbolic space is independent of the chosen definition.

Examples 

The hyperbolic plane is hyperbolic: in fact the incircle of a geodesic triangle is the circle of largest diameter contained in the triangle and every geodesic triangle lies in the interior of an ideal triangle, all of which are isometric with incircles of diameter 2 log 3. Note that in this case the Gromov product also has a simple interpretation in terms of the incircle of a geodesic triangle.
.

The Euclidean plane is not hyperbolic, for example because of the existence of homotheties.

Two "degenerate" examples of hyperbolic spaces are spaces with bounded diameter (for example finite or compact spaces) and the real line.

Metric trees and more generally real trees are the simplest interesting examples of hyperbolic spaces as they are 0-hyperbolic (i.e. all triangles are tripods).

The 1-skeleton of the triangulation by Euclidean equilateral triangles is not hyperbolic (it is in fact quasi-isometric to the Euclidean plane). A triangulation of the plane  has a hyperbolic 1-skeleton if every vertex has degree 7 or more.

The two-dimensional grid is not hyperbolic (it is quasi-isometric to the Euclidean plane). It is the Cayley graph of the fundamental group of the torus; the Cayley graphs of the fundamental groups of a surface of higher genus is hyperbolic (it is in fact quasi-isometric to the hyperbolic plane).

Hyperbolicity and curvature 

The hyperbolic plane (and more generally any Hadamard manifolds of sectional curvature ) is -hyperbolic. Since the curvature is multiplied by  we see that in this example the more (negatively) curved the space is, the lower the hyperbolicity constant.

Similar examples are CAT spaces of negative curvature. With respect to curvature and hyperbolicity it should be noted however that while curvature is a property that is essentially local, hyperbolicity is a large-scale property which does not see local (i.e. happening in a bounded region) metric phenomena. For example, the union of an hyperbolic space with a compact space with any metric extending the original ones remains hyperbolic.

Important properties

Invariance under quasi-isometry 

One way to precise the meaning of "large scale" is to require invariance under quasi-isometry. This is true of hyperbolicity.

If a geodesic metric space  is quasi-isometric to a -hyperbolic space  then there exists  such that  is -hyperbolic.

Approximate trees in hyperbolic spaces 

The definition of an hyperbolic space in terms of the Gromov product can be seen as saying that the metric relations between any four points are the same as they would be in a tree, up to the additive constant . More generally the following property shows that any finite subset of an hyperbolic space looks like a finite tree.

For any  there is a constant  such that the following holds: if  are points in a -hyperbolic space  there is a finite tree  and an embedding  such that  for all  and 

Exponential growth of distance and isoperimetric inequalities 

In an hyperbolic space  we have the following property:

This is reminiscent of the isoperimetric problem in the Euclidean plane. Here is a more specific statement to this effect.

Suppose that  is a cell complex of dimension 2 such that its 1-skeleton is hyperbolic, and there exists  such that the boundary of any 2-cell contains at most  1-cells. Then there is a constant  such that for any finite subcomplex  we have 
 

Here the area of a 2-complex is the number of 2-cells and the length of a 1-complex is the number of 1-cells. The statement above is a linear isoperimetric inequality ; it turns out that having such an isoperimetric inequality characterises Gromov-hyperbolic spaces. Linear isoperimetric inequalities were inspired by the small cancellation conditions from combinatorial group theory.

Quasiconvex subspaces 

A quasi-convex subspace of an hyperbolic space is hyperbolic.

Asymptotic cones 

All asymptotic cones of an hyperbolic space are real trees. This property characterises hyperbolic spaces.

The boundary of a hyperbolic space 

Generalising the construction of the ends of a simplicial tree there is a natural notion of boundary at infinity for hyperbolic spaces, which has proven very useful for analysing group actions.

In this paragraph  is a geodesic metric space which is hyperbolic.

Definition using the Gromov product 

A sequence  is said to converge to infinity if for some (or any) point  we have that  as both  and  go to infinity. Two sequences  converging to infinity are considered equivalent when  (for some or any ).

If  are two points on the boundary then their Gromov product is defined to be:

which is finite iff . One can then define a topology on  using the functions .

Definition for proper spaces using rays 

Let  be two quasi-isometric embeddings of  into  ("quasi-geodesic rays").

A similar realisation is to fix a basepoint and consider only quasi-geodesic rays originating from this point. In case  is geodesic and proper one can also restrict to genuine geodesic rays.

Examples 

When  is a simplicial regular tree the boundary is just the space of ends, which is a Cantor set.

When  is the unit disk, i.e. the Poincaré disk model for the hyperbolic plane,  the hyperbolic metric on the disk is

and the Gromov boundary can be identified with the unit circle.

The boundary of -dimensional hyperbolic space is homeomorphic to the -dimensional sphere and the metrics are similar to the one above.

Busemann functions 

If  is proper then its boundary is homeomorphic to the space of Busemann functions on  modulo translations.

The action of isometries on the boundary and their classification 

A quasi-isometry between two hyperbolic spaces  induces a homeomorphism between the boundaries.

This action can be used to classify isometries according to their dynamical behaviour on the boundary, generalising that for trees and classical hyperbolic spaces.

Then it is called an elliptic isometry.
Then  is called an hyperbolic isometry.
Third case:  has exactly one fixed point on the boundary and all orbits accumulate at this point. Then it is called a parabolic isometry.

More examples 

Subsets of the theory of hyperbolic groups can be used to give more examples of hyperbolic spaces, for instance the Cayley graph of a small cancellation group. It is also known that the Cayley graphs of certain models of random groups (which is in effect a randomly-generated infinite regular graph) tend to be hyperbolic very often.

It can be difficult and interesting to prove that certain spaces are hyperbolic. For example, the following hyperbolicity results have led to new phenomena being discovered for the groups acting on them.

The hyperbolicity of the curve complex has led to new results on the mapping class group.
Similarly, the hyperbolicity of certain graphs associated to the outer automorphism group Out(Fn) has led to new results on this group.

See also

Negatively curved group
Ideal triangle

Notes

References 

.

Metric geometry
Hyperbolic geometry